Merlin Wiley (May 7, 1875April 24, 1963) was a Michigan politician.

Early life
Wiley was born on May 7, 1875, in Shepherd, Michigan to Edgar James Wiley and Leona Wiley.

Education
Wiley graduated from Sault Ste. Marie High School. Wiley graduated from the University of Michigan twice, once from the Literary Department in 1902 and once from the Law Department in 1904.

Career
Wiley started practicing law in Sault Ste. Marie, Michigan in 1904. Wiley served as Chippewa County prosecuting attorney from 1909 to 1910. On November 3, 1914, Wiley was elected to the Michigan House of Representatives where he represented the Chippewa County district from January 6, 1915, to 1920. Wiley served as Michigan Attorney General from 1921 to 1923. Wiley resigned in 1923.

Personal life
Wiley married Helen Seymour in 1910. Together they had two children. Wiley was a member of the American Bar Association, the Knights Templar, and the Shriners. Wiley was a Freemason.

Death
Wiley died on April 24, 1963, in Ann Arbor, Michigan. Wiley was interred at Riverside Cemetery in Sault Ste. Marie, Michigan.

References

1875 births
1963 deaths
American Freemasons
Michigan Attorneys General
University of Michigan alumni
People from Sault Ste. Marie, Michigan
Republican Party members of the Michigan House of Representatives
Burials in Michigan
20th-century American politicians
20th-century American lawyers